Franz Bosbach (born 11 January 1952) is a German historian and university professor.

Life
Bosbach was born in Bornheim, a small town situated on the left bank of the Rhine, between Cologne and Bonn.

He received his doctorate from Bonn University in 1981 for a piece of analytical research on the longer lasting effects of the 1648 Peace of Westphalia.   His habilitation (higher academic qualification), also from  Bonn followed in 1986, this time for a piece of work entitled "Monarchia Universalis. Ein politischer Leitbegriff der frühen Neuzeit" ("Universal monarchy:  a political precept for the early modern period").   Between 1987 and 1989 he was supported by a bursary from the German Research Foundation's Heisenberg Programme.

In 1989 Bosbach was appointed visiting fellow at Clare College, Cambridge.   He held a teaching chair in early modern history between 1989 and 2008 at the recently established University of Bayreuth, where between 2005 and 2008 he served as vice-president for study and teaching.   Between 1995 and 2008 he was also "at the helm" of the Anglo-German (Coburg based) Prince Albert Society.

In 2008 he switched to the University of Duisburg-Essen where he was elected full-time vice-rector for study and teaching.   His term in office ended in 2014, since which time he has remained at the university as a professor of early modern history.

References

1952 births
Living people
People from Bornheim (Rheinland)
20th-century German historians
Academic staff of the University of Duisburg-Essen